Ward's flycatcher (Pseudobias wardi), also known as Ward's flycatcher-vanga, is a species of bird in the family Vangidae. It is monotypic within the genus Pseudobias. It is endemic to Madagascar. Its natural habitat is subtropical or tropical moist lowland forests.

Its common name and Latin binomial commemorate the English naturalist Christopher Ward, who collected the type specimen of the bird.

References

Ward's flycatcher
Endemic birds of Madagascar
Ward's flycatcher
Taxonomy articles created by Polbot